Before the 2003 season, Major League Soccer held Supplemental Drafts, in which players who had signed with the league after the 2003 MLS SuperDraft were made available for selection.

February 28, 2003 Supplemental Draft

Trades

April 10, 2003 Supplemental Draft

References

Major League Soccer drafts
Supplemental Draft
MLS Supplemental Draft
MLS Supplemental Draft